The 1802–03 United States Senate elections were held on various dates in various states. As these U.S. Senate elections were prior to the ratification of the Seventeenth Amendment in 1913, senators were chosen by state legislatures. Senators were elected over a wide range of time throughout 1802 and 1803, and a seat may have been filled months late or remained vacant due to legislative deadlock. In these elections, terms were up for the senators in Class 1.

The Democratic-Republican Party maintained and greatly expanded their majority of seats to over two-thirds of the Senate.

Change in composition

Before the elections 
Accounting for the 1802 special elections in New York, Rhode Island, and South Carolina.

Result of the regular elections

Beginning of the first session, October 17, 1803

Race summaries 
Unless noted, the number following candidates is the whole number vote(s), not a percentage.

Special elections during the 7th Congress 
In these special elections, the winner was seated before March 4, 1803; ordered by election date.

Races leading to the 8th Congress 

In these regular elections, the winner was seated on March 4, 1803; ordered by state.

All of the elections involved the Class 1 seats.

Special elections during the 8th Congress 
In this special election, the winner was seated in 1803 after March 4.

Early race leading to the Congress-after-next 
In this regular election, the winner was seated on March 4, 1805; ordered by state.

This election involved a Class 2 seat.

Connecticut 

Federalist incumbent James Hillhouse (originally elected in 1796) was re-elected.

Delaware

Maryland 

Samuel Smith won election over John Eager Howard by a margin of 21.05%, or 16 votes, for the Class 1 seat.

Massachusetts

New Hampshire (special)

New Jersey 

There were two elections to the class 1 seat.

New Jersey (regular) 

The New Jersey legislature failed to elect by the March 4, 1803, beginning of the term.

New Jersey (special) 

The governor appointed Democratic-Republican John Condit September 1, 1803, to continue the term. Condit was then unanimously elected November 3, 1803, to finish the term. No vote totals were recorded.

New York

New York (special) 

Democratic-Republican John Armstrong Jr., who had held the class 3 seat since 1801, resigned February 5, 1802, and Democratic-Republican DeWitt Clinton was elected February 23, 1802, to finish the term.  Clinton, however, resigned November 4, 1803, and Armstrong was appointed December 8, 1803, to his old seat.

New York (regular) 

Federalist Gouverneur Morris lost re-election to the class 1 seat to Democratic-Republican Theodorus Bailey in 1803.

Ohio 

Ohio joined the Union in 1803. New Democratic-Republican senators were elected April 1, 1803. Official records indicate that John Smith and Thomas Worthington were elected, and that Smith received the "long" term, while Worthington received the "short" one. They do not indicate if there were other candidates, or what the vote totals were.

Pennsylvania

Rhode Island

South Carolina (special)

Tennessee

Vermont 

Federalist Senator Nathaniel Chipman lost re-election to Democratic-Republican Israel Smith. Smith received 102 votes in the Vermont House of Representatives and 9 from the Governor and Council. Spencer received 75 votes from the House and 4 from the Governor and Council.

Virginia 

There were two elections to the same seat as the newly-re-elected senator died at the beginning of the next term.

Virginia (regular) 

Two-term Democratic-Republican Stevens Mason was re-elected in 1803.

Virginia (special) 

Mason died May 10, 1803, having just begun the new term. Democratic-Republican John Taylor was appointed but chose not to run to finish the term. Democratic-Republican Abraham B. Venable was elected December 7, 1803, as the unanimous choice of the Virginia General Assembly. No vote totals were recorded.

See also
 1802 United States elections
 1802–03 United States House of Representatives elections
 7th United States Congress
 8th United States Congress

References

Sources 
 Party Division in the Senate, 1789-Present, via Senate.gov